Katkol  is a village in the southern state of Karnataka, India. It is located in the Ramdurg taluk of Belgaum district in Karnataka.

Demographics
At the 2015 India census, Katkol had a population of 22143
 name="censusindia" />

See also
 Belgaum
 Districts of Karnataka

References

External links
http://Belgaum.nic.in/

Villages in Belagavi district